The Edge of the Abyss is a lost 1915 silent drama film directed by Walter Edwards and distributed by Triangle Film Corporation. It stars Mary Boland, then a stage comedic actress, in her film debut. Thomas H. Ince, one of the three key founders of Triangle, served as supervisor on the picture.

Cast
Mary Boland - Alma Clayton
Robert McKim - Neil Webster
Frank R. Mills - Wayne Burroughs (*this Frank Mills born 1870 died 1921)
Willard Mack - Jim Sims

References

External links
 The Edge of the Abyss at IMDb.com

Some newspaper accounts

1915 films
American silent feature films
Lost American films
Triangle Film Corporation films
1915 drama films
American black-and-white films
Silent American drama films
1915 lost films
Lost drama films
Films directed by Walter Edwards
1910s American films